Corrado Schlaepfer (27 November 1922 – 1 April 1980) was a Swiss fencer. He competed in the individual and team foil events at the 1948 Summer Olympics.

References

External links
 

1922 births
1980 deaths
Swiss male fencers
Olympic fencers of Switzerland
Fencers at the 1948 Summer Olympics